Pressure angle in relation to gear teeth, also known as the angle of obliquity, is the angle between the tooth face and the gear wheel tangent. It is more precisely the angle at a pitch point between the line of pressure (which is normal to the tooth surface) and the plane tangent to the pitch surface. The pressure angle gives the direction normal to the tooth profile.  The pressure angle is equal to the profile angle at the standard pitch circle and can be termed the "standard" pressure angle at that point.  Standard values are 14.5 and 20 degrees. Earlier gears with pressure angle 14.5 were commonly used because the cosine is larger for a smaller angle, providing more power transmission and less pressure on the bearing; however, teeth with smaller pressure angles are weaker. To run gears together properly their pressure angles must be matched.

The pressure angle is also the angle of the sides of the trapezoidal teeth on the corresponding rack.
The force transmitted during the mating of gear teeth acts along the normal. This force has components along the pitch line and the other along the line perpendicular to the pitch line. The force along the pitch line which is responsible for power transmission is proportional to the cosine of pressure angle. The one which exerts thrust (perpendicular to the pitch line) is proportional to the sine of pressure angle. So it is advised to keep the pressure angle low.

Just as there are three types of profile angle, there are three types of corresponding pressure angle: the transverse pressure angle, the normal pressure angle, and the axial pressure angle.

See also
 List of gear nomenclature
 Involute gear

References

Gears